The Partisan Coffee House was a radical venue of the New Left, at 7 Carlisle Street in the Soho district of London. It was established by historian Raphael Samuel in 1958 in the aftermath of the Suez Crisis and the Soviet invasion of Hungary. It closed in 1962, victim of a "business model" that was hospitable to the penniless intellectuals who patronised it, but wholly unrealistic.  The building is now utilised as office space.

Foundation
The group that founded the Partisan initially came together in Oxford, as editors and contributors of the Universities & Left Review magazine (ULR) before it merged with The New Reasoner to form New Left Review. In addition to Raphael Samuel, the group included the late Stuart Hall and Eric Hobsbawm. Funds to buy the Carlisle Street property were raised by soliciting donations and loans from political sympathisers. The Partisan was initially intended to raise funds for the ULR, and it was partly conceived as an alternative to the Italian-style coffee bars which had mushroomed in London in the 1950s.

Major investors included:
 Michael Redgrave, actor
 Ken Tynan, theatre critic
 John Calder, publisher
 Lewis Casson, actor and producer
 Wolf Mankowitz, screenwriter
 Naomi Mitchison, novelist
 Doris Lessing, author

Layout
The main coffee house, where food was served, was on the ground floor. Tables, mostly communal, were at the back of the building. At the front a few armchairs were provided. The business failure of the venture was largely attributable to its firm policy of allowing patrons to occupy tables indefinitely without ordering anything.

The basement was furnished with more tables, and chess sets were available.  Talks, poetry readings, film screenings and informal concerts were a fairly frequent feature of the basement area.  The coffee house was open from 10:30 to midnight daily.

Above the coffee house were the library, and the private offices of the ULR.

Food and drink
For most of its life, the Partisan sold cappuccino and croissants for 9d each.  Food served included farmhouse soup, borscht, mutton stew, liver dumplings and Whitechapel cheesecake.  The menus and some posters were designed by graphic designer Desmond Jeffery.

No alcoholic drinks were served, but they were readily available at any of several nearby pubs, notably The Highlander (now the Nellie Dean) just a few steps away on the corner of Dean Street.

Patronage
The Partisan attracted students, intellectuals, writers, musicians, actors and other theatrical types, all having left-wing sympathies. Among the clientele who were, or became, celebrities were:

 Doris Lessing, author
 Marghanita Laski, journalist
 Karel Reisz, film director
 Lindsay Anderson, theatre and film director
 Arnold Wesker, playwright, and the Centre 42 activists
 Peggy Seeger, folk singer
 Raymond Williams, novelist and critic
 Derek Marlowe, novelist and screenwriter
 Quentin Crisp, "The Naked Civil Servant"
 John Hurt, actor who famously portrayed Crisp in a 1975 made-for television film
 John Malcolm, actor
 John Berger, art critic and author
 Richard Hoggart, author and sociologist
 Christopher Logue, poet and pacifist
 Rod Stewart, entertainer

It was also visited by Special Branch officers who monitored conversations there.

The early Aldermaston Marches (1958–60) were partly planned in the basement of the Partisan, and the membership of the Committee of 100 was also drawn up at the coffee house.

The coffee house was the subject of an edition of the BBC television current affairs series Panorama, presented by Christopher Chataway.

In 2017 the Four Corners Gallery in Bethnal Green, London held an exhibition of memorabilia, documents and film of the cafe.

References

Coffeehouses and cafés in London
Left-wing politics in the United Kingdom
Soho Square
Soho, London
1958 establishments in England
1962 disestablishments in England